Performance Anxiety is a 2008 gay comedy romantic drama film directed by Paul Dangerfield, written by Josh Macphee, starring Luke Mitchell and Joss Mars. The film debuted at the Brisbane Queer Film Festival on 25 May 2008.

It is significant as it is Luke Mitchell's first starring role in a feature film. It is also the first gay-themed feature film shot in Brisbane, Australia.

Synopsis 

In this quirky romance, Jeff and Peter live together, but their characters are worlds apart. Jeff is a messy, hippie musician, while Peter is a tidy, almost obsessive, office worker.

Plot 

The movie opens with musician Jeff (played by Joss Mars) singing to a disinterested crowd in a bar. He goes home to his accountant boyfriend Peter (played by Luke Mitchell), with whom he struggles for connection.

Peter gets up the next morning, has a steamy shower, then reminds Jeff he has a big gig that night. However, Jeff is still asleep, having exotic dreams. At work, Peter deals with his crazy boss, Barry, but it all becomes too much for him and he leaves.

Jeff's alarm goes off, but he sleeps right through it, with amusing consequences. Eventually, Jeff wakes, has a bath, then rushes to go to the gig. As he leaves the apartment, he locks the keys inside, so Jeff investigates creative ways of getting back inside for the car keys.

Jeff arrives at the gig and smokes a joint with the stage manager. Backstage Peter finds Jeff, and they consider their problems. On stage, Jeff performs with his band and the Brisbane Lesbian and Gay Pride Choir. The crowd loves it.

Main cast

Main crew

Production 

It was filmed in Brisbane, Australia on a small budget by filmmakers Paul Dangerfield and Colin J. Pearce. The main filming took two months. Luke Mitchell commuted from the Gold Coast, Queensland, Australia. About 100 people were involved in making the movie. Main filming locations were The Sportsman Hotel in Spring Hill, Queensland and Art photos studios in Fig Tree Pocket.

DVD release 

Performance Anxiety was released independently on DVD, both PAL and NTSC versions in October 2008. The DVD includes subtitles in English, Spanish, German, French and Italian. One of the various extras is a Behind The Scenes featurette by Evan Randall Green (writer of The Pack). The Blu-ray version was released in November 2008. The DVD and Blu-ray were released by the film's production company Artphotos.

References

External links 
 
 

LGBT-related musical comedy-drama films
2008 LGBT-related films
2008 romantic comedy-drama films
Films set in Brisbane
Australian independent films
2008 films
LGBT-related romantic comedy-drama films
Australian LGBT-related films
2000s musical comedy-drama films
Films shot in Australia
2000s English-language films
2008 comedy films
2008 drama films
2008 independent films